Luis Antonio Peña (born July 5, 1993) is an Italian-born American professional mixed martial artist. A professional competitor since 2014, Peña competed in the Ultimate Fighting Championship (UFC), most notably being a contestant on The Ultimate Fighter: Undefeated season 27.

Early life
Luis was born to parents in the Navy stationed in Naples, Italy, but was adopted at a young age by a Latino-American couple. He grew up beginning his wrestling career at Little Rock Central High School, becoming a well-known wrestler and claiming the state championship in the process.

Mixed martial arts career

Early career 
Peña took his first amateur mixed martial arts fight on August 9, 2014. He fought Darian Bradshaw, and won the fight via submission in the second round. Peña finished his amateur career with a record of 15-2. He made his professional debut in 2016, against Chris Petty. He won via knockout.

The Ultimate Fighter 
Peña competed for Team Cormier on The Ultimate Fighter: Undefeated. He fought Jose Martinez Jr. on the third episode of the show, and won the fight via decision. Peña's run on the show was cut short, after suffering a foot injury during his quarterfinal fight. He was unable to fight for the rest of the show, but was guaranteed a spot on The Ultimate Fighter 27 Finale card by UFC president Dana White.

Ultimate Fighting Championships 
Peña made his UFC debut on July 16, 2018 at The Ultimate Fighter 27 Finale against Richie Smullen.  He won the fight via a submission in round one.

On November 10, 2018, Peña faced Michael Trizano at UFC Fight Night: Korean Zombie vs. Rodríguez. He lost the fight via split decision.

Peña faced Steven Peterson on March 23, 2019 at UFC Fight Night 148. At the weigh-ins, Luis Peña weighed in at 148.5 lbs, 2.5 pounds over the featherweight non-title fight limit of 146 lbs. Peña  was fined 30% of his fight purse and the bout proceeded at catchweight. He won the fight via unanimous decision.

Peña faced Matt Wiman on June 22, 2019 at UFC on ESPN+ 12. He won the fight via technical knockout in round three.

Peña faced Matt Frevola on October 12, 2019 at UFC on ESPN+ 19. He lost the fight via split decision.

Peña  was scheduled to face Alex Muñoz on February 29, 2020 at UFC Fight Night 169. However, on February 23, 2020, it was announced that Muñoz was pulled from the card due to injury, and he was replaced by Steve Garcia. He won the fight via unanimous decision.

Peña faced Khama Worthy on June 27, 2020 at UFC on ESPN: Poirier vs. Hooker. He lost the fight via a guillotine choke in round three. Peña was suspended four and a half months and fined 15% of his purse by the Nevada State Athletic Commission on September 3, 2020 after he tested positive for marijuana. The suspension was cut from the usual six months due to him taking the fight against Worthy on short notice: marijuana is only considered illegal by USADA during the competition window for fights. It is retroactive to June 17, 2020 and he will be eligible to compete again on November 2, 2020.

Peña was scheduled to face Drakkar Klose, replacing Jai Herbert, on February 20, 2021 at UFC Fight Night 185. However, the bout was canceled after Klose's corner tested positive for COVID-19.

Peña faced Alexander Munoz on April 17, 2021 at UFC on ESPN 22. He won the fight via split decision, with 11 out of 16 media scores giving it to Munoz.

Following his October arrest, the UFC announced that Peña had been released from the UFC.

Post UFC 
Peña announced that he had signed with ACA and would be competing in the ACA Lightweight Grand Prix, with his first bout being against Eduard Vartanyan at ACA 139 on May 21, 2022. Pena would pull out of the bout due to having trouble securing a visa.

Peña was instead booked against Zach Zane in a 160 lb catchweight bout as the main event of Titan FC 76 on May 6, 2022. He won the bout via triangle choke under a minute into the first round.

Peña faced Gustavo Wurlitzer on June 3, 2022 at Titan FC 77. He won the bout at the end of the first round via TKO.

Peña faced Will Brooks at XMMA 5 on July 23, 2022. He lost the bout via unanimous decision.

Legal troubles

June 2021 
On June 18, 2021 Peña was arrested in Florida on charges of strong-arm robbery, battery, and criminal mischief for an incident that allegedly took place on June 14, 2021. In early August 2021 news surfaced that Peña's charges had been downgraded to misdemeanor charges of simple battery and criminal mischief. He was, however, charged with another misdemeanor battery stemming from an incident that allegedly happened on May 22, 2021. However, his ex-girlfriend decided not to press charges.

October 2021 
On October 9, 2021, Peña was arrested by Florida police officers for domestic battery after he allegedly struck and bit his girlfriend. Peña also allegedly struck another woman who witnessed the assault when she tried to intervene. On June 10, 2022, Peña pleaded not guilty to the charges via a written plea; court date to be determined.

November 2021 
On November 24, 2021, Peña was arrested by Florida police officers, facing four misdemeanors charges including battery, criminal mischief, battery causing bodily harm, and touching or striking battery or domestic violence. He was booked into the Rein Detention Center in Pompano Beach, Florida. Peña had a court date currently scheduled for April 8, with the hearing taking place via Zoom and will involve a determination of counsel hearing. In June 2022 news surfaced that the case was disposed without further information.

Mixed martial arts record

|-
|Loss
|align=center|11–5
|LT Nelson
|Decision (unanimous)
|Sparta 95
|
|align=center|5
|align=center|5:00
|Aurora, Colorado, United States
|
|-
|Loss
|align=center|11–4
|Will Brooks
|Decision (split)
|XMMA 5
|
|align=center|3
|align=center|5:00
|Columbia, South Carolina, United States
|
|-
|Win
|align=center|11–3
|Gustavo Wurlitzer
|TKO (punches)
|Titan FC 77
|
|align=center|1
|align=center|4:44
|Miramar, Florida, United States
|
|-
|Win
|align=center|10–3
|Zach Zane 
|Submission (triangle choke)
|Titan FC 76
|
|align=center|1
|align=center|0:59
|Miramar, Florida, United States
|
|-
|Win
|align=center|9–3
|Alexander Munoz
|Decision (split)
|UFC on ESPN: Whittaker vs. Gastelum
|
|align=center|3
|align=center|5:00
|Las Vegas, Nevada, United States
|
|-
|Loss
|align=center|8–3
|Khama Worthy
|Submission (guillotine choke)
|UFC on ESPN: Poirier vs. Hooker
|
|align=center|3
|align=center|2:53
|Las Vegas, Nevada, United States
|
|-
|Win
|align=center|8–2
|Steve Garcia
|Decision (unanimous)
|UFC Fight Night: Benavidez vs. Figueiredo 
|
|align=center|3
|align=center|5:00
|Norfolk, Virginia, United States
|
|-
|Loss
|align=center|7–2
|Matt Frevola
|Decision (split)
|UFC Fight Night: Joanna vs. Waterson                                                                                                                                                                                                                                                                                                                                                                                                                                                                                                                                                                          
|
|align=center|3
|align=center|5:00
|Tampa, Florida, United States
|
|-
|Win
|align=center|7–1
|Matt Wiman
|TKO (punches)
|UFC Fight Night: Moicano vs. Korean Zombie 
|
|align=center|3
|align=center|1:14
|Greenville, South Carolina, United States
|
|-
|Win
|align=center|6–1
|Steven Peterson
|Decision (unanimous) 
|UFC Fight Night: Thompson vs. Pettis 
|
|align=center|3
|align=center|5:00
|Nashville, Tennessee, United States
|
|-
|Loss
|align=center|5–1
|Michael Trizano
|Decision (split)
|UFC Fight Night: Korean Zombie vs. Rodríguez
|
|align=center|3
|align=center|5:00
| Denver, Colorado, United States
|
|-
|Win
|align=center|5–0
|Richie Smullen
|Submission (guillotine choke)
|The Ultimate Fighter: Undefeated Finale
|
|align=center|1
|align=center|3:32
| Las Vegas, Nevada, United States
|
|- 
| Win
| align=center| 4–0
| Kobe Wall
| Submission (kimura)
| Worlds Collide
| 
| align=center| 3
| align=center| 1:40
| Rome, Georgia, United States
| 
|-
| Win
| align=center| 3–0
| Damir Ferhatbegovic
| Submission (rear-naked choke)
| Valor Fights 41: Cala vs Wright
| 
| align=center| 2
| align=center| 4:47
| Elizabethton, Tennessee United States
|
|-
| Win
| align=center| 2–0
| Brandon Schehl
| Submission (rear-naked choke)
| Shamrock FC 279
| 
| align=center| 2
| align=center| 3:40
| Kansas City, Missouri, United States
|
|-
| Win
| align=center| 1–0
| Chris Petty
| KO (punch)
| Fight Hard MMA
| 
| align=center| 1
| align=center| 4:22
| St. Charles, Missouri, United States
|
|-

Mixed martial arts exhibition record

|-
|Win
|align=center|1–0
| Jose Martinez Jr.
| Decision (unanimous)
| The Ultimate Fighter: Undefeated
| (airdate)
|align=center|2
|align=center|5:00
|Las Vegas, Nevada, United States
|

Professional boxing record

See also
 List of male mixed martial artists

References

1993 births
Living people
American male mixed martial artists
American practitioners of Brazilian jiu-jitsu
Featherweight mixed martial artists
Lightweight mixed martial artists
Mixed martial artists utilizing wrestling
Mixed martial artists utilizing boxing
Mixed martial artists utilizing Brazilian jiu-jitsu
Ultimate Fighting Championship male fighters
American sportspeople in doping cases
Doping cases in mixed martial arts